Guillaume Jean Sebastien Long (born 22 February 1977) is an Ecuadorian former politician and academic who served as the Minister of Foreign Affairs of Ecuador and Human Mobility, in the government of Rafael Correa. He was previously the Minister of Culture and Heritage, and Minister of Knowledge and Human Talent. Long later became Ecuador's Permanent Representative to the United Nations in Geneva, before resigning in January 2018 over strong disagreements with President Moreno.

Early life and education
Long was born in Créteil, a suburb of Paris, France, in 1977, to a French mother and a British father. He completed his studies at the University of London, where he earned a PhD at the Institute for the Study of the Americas, a Masters in Political Science and a Bachelor in History at the School of Oriental and African Studies. Long first went to Latin America at the age of 18 and spent some extended time traveling in Central America before arriving in Ecuador in 1996.

Political career

After completing his PhD, Long taught history and international relations in several Ecuadorian universities. His political career started when he became advisor to the National Secretary of Planning and Development René Ramírez Gallegos. Long also became a member of the Academic Board of the Instituto de Altos Estudios Nacionales (IAEN), and later became its dean.

In September 2011, President Correa appointed Long as a member of the "Consejo de Evaluación, Acreditación y Aseguramiento de la Calidad de la Educación Superior" ("Council of Evaluation, Accreditation and Quality Assurance in Higher Education")(CEAACES). The members of the CEAACES eventually elected Long as their president. His task, as mandated by the new Constitution and by the Law of Higher Education, was to guarantee a minimal degree of quality in Ecuador's universities and to close down those establishments, often referred to as garage universities, considered too precarious to offer higher education degrees. Some of them were seen as incurring in the outright sale of degrees or not upholding the most elementary academic standards expected from an institution of higher education. In April 2012, Long announced the closure of 14 sub-standard universities, in a polemic decision that meant that almost 10% of the total student population was affected. Students whose universities were closed down were later enrolled on a scheme to be reinserted in the remainder of Ecuador's higher education institutions.

On 6 May 2013, Long was named Coordinating Minister for Knowledge and Human Talent. His role was to oversee the Ministry of Education, the Ministry of Higher Education, Science and Technology, the Ministry of Culture and Heritage, as well as a number of public research institutes and other state entities. From this post, Long was one of the key promoters of the creation of four high standard universities in Ecuador: Ikiam located in the Amazon and essentially focused on life sciences; Yachay University, a university located at the heart of a science, technology and innovation cluster; Unae, a large-scale teacher's training university for primary and secondary teachers; and Uniartes, a university for the arts located in the historic center of Guayaquil.

On 25 March 2015, Correa appointed Long as Minister of Culture and Heritage, a post he held until March 2016. Long dedicated much of this his efforts as Minister of Culture to passing a new and long overdue Law of Culture mandated by the 2008 Constitution.

Between May 2014 and March 2016, Long was chairman of the International Relations Committee of PAIS Alliance, a socialist political movement led by Correa. He was the chief organizers of two conferences (ELAP I and ELAP II) that brought to Quito leftist political parties and movements from Latin America and the world. The chosen date was 30 September, the anniversary of the failed police uprising/coup against Correa in 2010.

As Foreign Minister
On 3 March 2016, Long became Ecuador's new Minister of Foreign Affairs and Human Mobility. His time at the helm of Ecuador's foreign policy was marked by the 16 April 2016 earthquake and the channeling of the international aid and relief efforts.

It was also marked by the crisis of UNASUR and CELAC and the regional divisions and tensions over Venezuela, with Long recurrently insisting on the need for dialogue and clashing over this issue with OAS Secretary General Luis Almagro at the 45th session of the OAS General Assembly in June 2016.

Long played an important role in the establishment of peace talks between the Colombian Government and the ELN guerrillas in Quito, Ecuador, and in the humanitarian steps that were taken in 2016 and 2017 to pave the way for the start of the formal negotiations on 7 February 2017, including the release of ELN prisoners from Colombian jails and of several people held in captivity by the ELN.

Long played a leading role in seeking regional consensus in Latin America to demand that the United States put an end to the Wet feet, dry feet policy that favored and incentivized Cuban migration, affecting both the security and human rights of the migrants and the stability of transit countries.

During Long's term, Ecuador was elected Chair of the Group of 77 for the first time in its history. Long made the most of the scandal of the Panama Papers and Correa's calling for a referendum over barring civil servants from holding assets in tax havens, and made the struggle against tax evasion a cornerstone of Ecuador's foreign policy and a core theme during his term as foreign minister. Long recurrently pressed this matter whether at the helm of the G77 or in other multilateral fora.

In November 2016, during Long's term as Foreign Minister, President Xi Jinping visited Ecuador in the first State-visit of a President of the People's Republic of China to the South American country. This was a high-profile visit and it further consolidated the close relations between China and Ecuador fostered during Correa's presidency

During Long's time at the Ministry of Foreign Affairs, the case of Julian Assange gained renewed global prominence. In December 2016, Assange was finally questioned in the Ecuadorian Embassy in London by Ecuadorian and Swedish prosecutors. In May 2017, the Swedish prosecutor Marianne Ny announced that she was dropping the case against Assange. This was hailed as a great victory for Assange and bolstered Ecuador's international position and its justification of its granting of the political asylum. Long had been active in international circles pressing for a denouement to the Assange issue, including a letter to his Swedish counterpart in which he argued that the delays of the Swedish prosecution and absence of charges amounted to a miscarriage of justice. In November 2016, Long also oversaw the cutting off of Assange's internet connection during the US presidential elections. Ecuador's Ministry of Foreign Affairs argued that it refused to meddle in other countries' internal affairs particularly in times of elections, but that this measure bore no relations with the asylum.

Long was also in charge of Ecuador's oil negotiations within OPEC and represented Ecuador at the OPEC meetings in Algiers on 29 September 2016 and Vienna on 30 November 2016, and the 10 December 2016 OPEC-non OPEC meeting in Vienna that resulted in the commitment to cut oil production by just under 1.8 million barrels a day.

After the election of Donald Trump in the United States, and the threat of an increase in the deportations of Ecuadorians, Long also implemented a "contingency plan" in support of Ecuadorian migrants.

Ambassador to the UN

The new President of Ecuador, Lenin Moreno, named Long the Permanent Representative of Ecuador to the United Nations in Geneva. Long's stint at the head of the diplomatic mission is mostly marked by his leadership of the working group on the elaboration of a treaty on transnational corporations and human rights, a subject on which he is actively involved.

In January 2018, Long resigned from his position in a public letter to Moreno, in which he denounces the new government's unconstitutional measures and its betrayal of the ideals and program of the Citizen's Revolution on which the new government was elected.

Criticism
Long was heavily criticized, notably by former Ecuadorian foreign ministers, for being the first non-Ecuadorian-born Foreign Minister.

During the unrest in Venezuela throughout 2016 and in the first half of 2017, there was recurrent criticism that Long was not being hard enough on the Maduro Government and should take a more forceful stance in line with most other Latin American countries in the region outside of ALBA. This issue played an important role in Ecuadorian domestic politics. In one of his weekly editorials, former Foreign Minister  claimed that Long had said that "one breathes happiness" in Venezuela. Long denounced this as a lie and pushed Carrión to prove these had been his words. Unable to do so, Carrión was eventually forced to apologize on Twitter. During the elections of 2017, Long said that there was an attempt to influence the population "with the argument that Ecuador is going to become like Venezuela. (…) Well no, Ecuador is not Venezuela". This declaration was the Ecuadorian Government's clearest attempt thus far to distance itself from the Venezuelan crisis.
 
Business sectors but also certain factions within Correa's government complained that Long, along with other senior officials in the Correa administration, opposed the free trade agreement between Ecuador, Colombia and Peru, and the European Union, which Ecuador finally adhered to in December 2016. He and others were considered to be the "enemy within".

See also
List of foreign ministers in 2017
List of current foreign ministers

References

1977 births
Alumni of the University of London
Ecuadorian people of British descent
Ecuadorian people of French descent
Foreign ministers of Ecuador
Culture ministers of Ecuador
Living people
PAIS Alliance politicians
Alumni of the School of Advanced Study
Politicians from Paris